Seth Wulsin (born April 15, 1981 in Spring Valley, NY) is an independent journalist  and contemporary artist working primarily with space, time and light through large-scale, site-specific, ephemeral sculpture, drawing and architectural performance.

Wulsin is best known for the work, 16 Tons, Prison Demolition, a massive public piece in Buenos Aires, Argentina, that worked with the demolition of the infamous Caseros Prison between 2005 and 2009.

In 2010, Wulsin's work was thrown into the spotlight when a sculpture from his counter-surveillance oriented Time Drops in Decay series, consisting of higher-dimensional internally reflecting mirror objects, was broken by then-Mayor of Buenos Aires Mauricio Macri (who later became president of Argentina) on a televised tour of the art fair ArteBA. Artist and filmmaker, Joshua Sandler, used the ensuing scandal as raw material for a documentary film called Who gives A Shit About Art? critiquing the intersection of art, politics and capital. Wulsin's work Wishing Well, an expansion on the Time Drops series, was exhibited at Boulder Museum of Contemporary Art in 2011.

References

External links
 'Corrections and Collections', Places Journal
 'In Memory of State Terror', Pagina/12
 Smithsonian Magazine
 Artists in Latin America
 'ArteBA Un "Blooper" de Macri', Clarín
 'La carta del artista', Pagina/12
 Macri Breaks Wulsin Sculpture at ArteBA

American sculptors
American contemporary artists
American conceptual artists
Land artists
People from Spring Valley, New York
Artists from New York (state)
American journalists
Public art
Living people
1981 births